Uropterygius fuscoguttatus is a moray eel found in coral reefs in the Pacific and Indian Oceans. It is commonly known as the brown spotted snake moray, brown snake moray, or the finless moray. It is mostly dark brown in colour, with darker brown spots approaching the tail.

References

fuscoguttatus
Fish described in 1953